Patrol Boat No. 105 (第百五號) (ex-Arayat) was a former Philippine Commonwealth customs inspection and enforcement cutter that was sunk by the Japanese during the invasion of the Philippines and later raised and designated as a patrol boat in the Imperial Japanese Navy.

History
She was laid down at Schichau's Danzig shipyard, launched on 9 May 1931, and delivered on 13 August 1931.
 
During the Japanese invasion the Philippines, she returned to her home port of Manila where the Asiatic Fleet had retreated. On 27 December 1941, Japanese attack planes from the 1st Kōkūtai and the Takao Kōkūtai attacked Manila Bay setting Arayat, her fellow customs cutter Mindoro, and the motor vessel Ethel Edwards ablaze while also sinking the lighthouse tender Canlaon outright, and so heavily damaging the steamship Taurus, her crew was forced to scuttle her.

She was raised by the Imperial Japanese Navy and rebuilt at the No. 103 Repair Facility at Cavite Naval Base. On 1 September 1943, she was renamed Patrol Boat No. 105, and registered in the Sasebo Naval District, and assigned to the Third Expeditionary Fleet, Southwest Area Fleet, based out of Manila.

Battle of Ormoc Bay

On 5 October 1944, she left Miri along with Type D escort ships CD-18 and CD-26 providing escort for Myogi Maru, Heian Maru, Mikasa Maru, and Teiyu Maru (ex-Carignano) headed for Manila. The convoy was carrying supplies for the besieged forces on Leyte Island. The convoy arrived safely at Manila on 2 November 1944. On 27 November 1944, she departed Manila as part of convoy TA-6 with s CH-45 and CH-53 and freighters Shinsho Maru and Shinetsu Maru. On 28 November 1944, the convoy arrived safely at Ormoc Bay, Leyte. The three escorts were assigned to guard the entrance to the harbor while the transports unloaded. The transports were able to unload their much-needed supplies although after departing, Shinetsu Maru and CH-45 were sunk by American planes on 29 November 1944 and Shinsho Maru met the same fate on 30 November 1944.

On 10 January 1945, PB-105 was struck from the Naval List.

References

1931 ships
Ships built by Schichau
Ships built in Danzig
Ships of the Imperial Japanese Navy